Cavia anolaimae is a guinea pig species from South America. It is found in Colombia near Bogotá. It is believed to be a feral offshoot of the domestic guinea pig, Cavia porcellus, and is often treated as a synonym of C. porcellus, but Zúñiga et al. (2002), based on morphologic characters, recognized them as different species. According to the molecular analysis of Dunnum and Salazar (2010) C. anolaimae is a subspecies of Cavia aperea, C. aperea anolaimae, and a possible synonymous of C. a. guianae .

References
 Woods C. A. and C. W. Kilpatrick.  2005. Hystricognathi pp. 1538-1600 in D. E. Wilson and M. A. Reeder, eds. Mammal Species of the World, 3rd edition, p. 1553.

 Zúñiga, H.; Pinto-Nolla, M.; Hernández-Camacho, J.I. & Torres-Martínez, O.M. 2002. "Revisión taxonómica de las especies del género Cavia (Rodentia: Caviidae) en Colombia"; Acta  Zoológica Mexicana 87: 111–123.
 Donnum, Jonathan L. & Salazar-Bravo, Jorge. 2010. "Molecular systematics, taxonomy and biogeography of the genus Cavia (Rodentia: Caviidae)"; Journal of Zoological Systematics and Evolutionary Research 48(4): 376–388.

Guinea pigs
Endemic fauna of Colombia
Rodents of South America
Mammals of Colombia
Mammals described in 1916